Echinopterys is a genus in the Malpighiaceae, a family of about 75 genera of flowering plants in the order Malpighiales. Echinopterys comprises 2 species of shrubs or woody vines native to dry habitats of Mexico and is distinctive in its bristly fruits.

External links
Malpighiaceae Malpighiaceae - description, taxonomy, phylogeny, and nomenclature
Echinopterys

Malpighiaceae
Malpighiaceae genera